Finlay Bealham (born 9 October 1991) is an Australian-born Irish rugby union player. He primarily plays as a prop, and can play at both tighthead and loosehead. Bealham represents  at international level, qualifying to play for them through his grandmother from Enniskillen in Northern Ireland. Bealham currently plays his club rugby for Irish provincial team Connacht Rugby in the URC league. Through his grandmother, Bealham is related to Northern Irish heavyweight boxer Gordon Ferris.

Early life
Bealham grew up in Canberra. He attended St Edmund's College in the city. He played rugby league at a young age before concentrating solely on union from the age of 16. Despite being selected for the Australian schools side and representing their 'A' side, Bealham was not given a spot in the Brumbies academy and instead moved to Ireland to start his professional career.

Rugby career

Club
Bealham moved to Ireland in 2010 and initially played in his grandmother's native province of Ulster with the amateur side, Belfast Harlequins. Following the 2011 Junior World Cup, he was offered a place in the academy of Connacht, another province. Moving to the new province also meant moving clubs, with Bealham joining Galway Corinthians. Bealham was promoted from the sub-academy to the full academy ahead of the 2012–13 season.

While in the academy Bealham played for the province's second-tier side, the Connacht Eagles. Bealham made his full debut for Connacht in the 2013–14 Pro12 on 23 February 2014. He came on from the bench away to Italian side Zebre, replacing Denis Buckley at loosehead on the 74 minute mark. Bealham went on to make a further five replacement appearances in the Pro12 that season. In April 2014, it was announced that Bealham had signed a professional contract with the province to last until summer 2015, making him a full member of Connacht's senior squad.

In the 2014–15 season Bealham was moved from loosehead to play tighthead by Connacht forwards coach Dan McFarland. Despite the change, he continued to play regularly for the side, as he had at the end of the previous season. Bealham made his European debut on 6 December 2014, coming on from the bench in the home game to Bayonne in the Challenge Cup pool stages. He made his first start in the reverse fixture the following week. Bealham made his first league start on 26 December 2014 against Ulster. During the course of the season he played 15 games in the 2014–15 Pro12, and made a total of five appearances in the Challenge Cup. He also featured in Connacht's final game of the season, a play-off against Gloucester which they lost 40–32 after extra time. During the course of the season, Bealham signed a new two-year deal to keep him with the province until summer 2017.

Bealham was again a key part of Connacht's squad for the 2015–16 season, being the only player to feature in all 31 of the team's games in the league and in Europe. He started 13 of these games, and scored his first try for the team against Munster on 16 April 2016. On 28 May 2016, Bealham started in the Pro12 Grand Final as Connacht won 20–10 against Irish rivals and reigning champions Leinster to claim the team's first major trophy in their 121-year history.

Ahead of the 2016–17 season, Bealham signed a contract extension to keep him in Galway until 2019. With the retirement of Nathan White, he came into the season as Connacht's first choice tighthead. Bealham played 19 of the team's 22 games in the 2016–17 Pro12, starting all but six, and featured in all seven of the side's European games for the season. He continued to be a key player for Connacht in the following season and made his 100th appearance for the side on 16 February 2018 against Zebre In October 2018, Bealham signed another extension to his Connacht deal, this time extending to the end of the 2020–21 season.

International
Bealham was selected to play for the Australian schools team in 2009. He featured for the team's 'A' side against Tonga and New Zealand.

After becoming aware of his qualification to play for Ireland, Bealham became involved in the country's youth set-up through the Irish Exiles program. He made his debut for Ireland Under-20s against Italy in the 2011 Six Nations Under 20s Championship. Later that year, Bealham was part of the Irish squad for the 2011 IRB Junior World Championship. He made a total of four appearances for the side, three of these coming as a replacement.

Bealham was part of the Emerging Ireland squad for the 2015 Tbilisi Cup. He played in two of the team's fixtures, replacing Stephen Archer in the games against Emerging Italy and Georgia, scoring a try in the latter.

In January 2016, Bealham was called up to Ireland's squad for the Six Nations to replace the injured Marty Moore. After Cian Healy injured his hamstring, Bealham was promoted to the bench for the game against Italy. On 12 March 2016, 65 minutes into the game, he replaced Jack McGrath for his debut. Bealham was named in the Irish squad for the team's 2016 tour to South Africa, where he was named on the bench for all three tests, coming on as a 59th minute replacement for Tadhg Furlong in the second.

Bealham had been due to play in the first test of the 2022 Ireland rugby union tour of New Zealand in Dunedin on 2 July but COVID-19 meant he could not.

Honours
Connacht
Pro12 (1): 2016

Ireland
Triple Crown: (2) 2022, 2023
Six Nations Championship: (1) 2023
Grand Slam: (1) 2023

References

External links

 Ireland Profile
 Ireland Under-20 Profile
 EPCR Profile
 Pro12 Profile

1991 births
Living people
Australian people of Irish descent
Australian rugby union players
Connacht Rugby players
Expatriate rugby union players in Ireland
Ireland international rugby union players
Irish rugby union players
Rugby union props
Rugby union players from Canberra
Irish Exiles rugby union players